Samuel William Gaze (born 12 December 1995) is a New Zealand cross-country and road cyclist, who currently rides for UCI ProTeam . He won the under-23 Cross-Country at the 2016 UCI Mountain Bike & Trials World Championships and the 2017 UCI Mountain Bike World Championships. He also competes on occasion in road racing events, winning the National Criterium Championships in 2017 and 2018.

Career
At the Men's cross-country event at the 2014 Commonwealth Games, Gaze won the silver medal behind fellow New Zealand rider Anton Cooper. Gaze was selected ahead of Cooper, who suffered medical conditions during 2016, to represent New Zealand at the 2016 Summer Olympics. He had two punctures in the Olympic race and his gears failed, and he pulled out when he got lapped.

In March 2018, Gaze became the first New Zealander to win an elite UCI Mountain Bike World Cup title, when he claimed the cross country event in the first round of the season in Stellenbosch, South Africa. In April 2018, Gaze won the gold medal in the cross country event at the 2018 Commonwealth Games. Despite his win, Gaze came under significant media attention for his perceived unsportsmanlike behaviour towards his compatriot and silver place winner Cooper. Gaze was fined CHF200 by the International Cycling Union for showing Cooper the finger during the race.

In August 2019, Gaze joined UCI WorldTeam  as a stagiaire for the second half of the season. For 2020, Gaze joined the  team to contest road and mountain biking events.

Personal life
Of Māori descent, Gaze affiliates to the Te Āti Awa iwi.

Major results

Mountain bike

2014
 2nd  Cross-country, Commonwealth Games
2015
 2nd  Eliminator, UCI Urban World Championships
2016
 1st  Cross-country, National Championships
 1st  Cross-country, UCI World Under-23 Championships
 UCI Under-23 XCO World Cup
1st Cairns
1st Albstadt
3rd La Bresse
3rd Lenzerheide
2017
 1st  Cross-country, UCI World Under-23 Championships
2018
 1st  Cross-country, Commonwealth Games
 UCI XCO World Cup
1st Stellenbosch
 UCI XCC World Cup
1st Nové Město
1st Mont-Sainte-Anne
2nd Albstadt
 Copa Catalana Internacional
1st Girona
 2nd Cross-country, Oceania Championships
2021
 Swiss Bike Cup
1st Basel
 Copa Catalana Internacional BTT
1st Girona
2022
 UCI World Championships
1st  Marathon
1st  Short track
 1st  Cross-country, Commonwealth Games
 UCI XCC World Cup
1st Albstadt
 Copa Catalana Internacional
2nd Vallnord

Road
2017
 1st  National Criterium Championships
2018
 1st  National Criterium Championships

References

External links

1995 births
Living people
New Zealand male cyclists
Cyclists at the 2014 Commonwealth Games
Cyclists at the 2018 Commonwealth Games
Commonwealth Games gold medallists for New Zealand
Commonwealth Games silver medallists for New Zealand
Sportspeople from Tokoroa
Cross-country mountain bikers
New Zealand mountain bikers
Cyclists at the 2016 Summer Olympics
Olympic cyclists of New Zealand
Te Āti Awa people
New Zealand Māori sportspeople
Commonwealth Games medallists in cycling
20th-century New Zealand people
21st-century New Zealand people
Medallists at the 2014 Commonwealth Games
Medallists at the 2018 Commonwealth Games